Javier Siverio Toro (born 14 November 1997) is a Spanish professional footballer who plays as a forward for Indian Super League club Hyderabad.

Club career
Siverio was born in Santa Cruz de Tenerife, Canary Islands, and joined Las Palmas' youth setup in 2015, after already having made his senior debut with Laguna de Tenerife. He finished his formation in the following year, being initially assigned to the C-team in the regional leagues; during the season, he also appeared sparingly with the reserves, helping in their promotion to Segunda División B.

In July 2018, Siverio moved to another reserve team, Rayo Cantabria in Tercera División. On 18 November, he scored a hat-trick in a 4–3 home win against Barreda Balompié, and repeated the feat the following 17 March, in a 3–0 home success over Benzana.

Siverio made his first team debut for Racing Santander on 19 May 2019, coming on as a second-half substitute for Quique Rivero and scoring the equalizer in a 2–2 home draw against Logroñés. He also featured in a further two matches for the main squad during the play-offs as his side returned to Segunda División after a four-year absence.

On 30 June 2020, after scoring a career-best 24 goals during the campaign for the B's, Siverio signed a new contract with Racing until 2022. He made his professional debut on 4 July 2020, replacing Sergio Ruiz in a 1–2 Segunda División home loss against Elche, which ensured his team's relegation.

On 30 August 2021, Siverio joined Indian Super League side Hyderabad FC ahead of the 2021–22 Indian Super League season.

Personal life
Siverio's older brother Marco is also a footballer and a forward. He notably represented the University of Delaware's Delaware Fightin' Blue Hens and EMF Atlético Unión Güímar.

Career statistics

Honours
Hyderabad
Indian Super League Playoffs :  2021–22

References

External links

1997 births
Living people
Footballers from Santa Cruz de Tenerife
Spanish footballers
Association football forwards
Segunda División players
Segunda División B players
Tercera División players
Divisiones Regionales de Fútbol players
UD Las Palmas C players
UD Las Palmas Atlético players
Rayo Cantabria players
Racing de Santander players

Hyderabad FC players
Spanish expatriate footballers
Spanish expatriate sportspeople in India
Expatriate footballers in India